Caroll is a name, a variant of Carol, Carrol, or Carroll. Notable people with the name include:

Given name
 Caroll Spinney (1933–2019), American puppeteer and cartoonist

Middle name
DeRosey Caroll Cabell (1861 – 1924), American general

Surname
 Donna Caroll (1938 - 2020), Argentine singer and actress
 Melinda Caroll (born 1952), American singer, composer, and record producer

See also

Carolle
Carroll (given name)
Caroly (name)

Surnames from given names